The 2012 Chrono des Nations was the 31st edition of the Chrono des Nations cycle race and was held on 21 October 2012. The race started and finished in Les Herbiers. The race was won by Tony Martin.

General classification

References

2012
2012 in road cycling
2012 in French sport
October 2012 sports events in France